Nectandra baccans is a species of plant in the family Lauraceae. It is endemic to Venezuela.

References

baccans
Endemic flora of Venezuela
Conservation dependent plants
Taxa named by Carl Meissner
Taxonomy articles created by Polbot